Yvonne de Bray (12 May 1889 – 1 February 1954) was a French stage and film actress. She was born Yvonne Laurence Blanche de Bray in Paris and died there.

In 1939, she and her partner Violette Morris invited Jean Cocteau to stay with them at their houseboat docked at Pont de Neuilly where he wrote the three-act play Les Monstres sacrés. She was a successful stage actress but it was Cocteau who introduced her as a film actress in his 1943 film, L'Éternel retour.

Selected filmography
1952 – We Are All Murderers
1950 – Olivia
1949 – Gigi
1948 – L'Aigle à deux têtes
1948 – Les Parents terribles
1943 – L'Éternel Retour

References

Yvonne de Bray Film Biography – Film – Time Out Chicago

External links

1880s births
1954 deaths
French stage actresses
French film actresses
French silent film actresses
20th-century French actresses
French lesbian actresses
Burials at Père Lachaise Cemetery